Bríd Brennan (born 1955) is an Irish actress who is known for her film, TV and theatre work. She originated the role of Agnes in the Brian Friel play Dancing at Lughnasa, for which she won the 1992 Tony Award for Best Featured Actress in a Play. She is also a three-time Olivier Award nominee; for Rutherford and Son (1995), The Little Foxes (2002) and The Ferryman (2018).

As well as her roles in the films Maeve 1982, Anne Devlin 1984 and Mike Leigh's Four days in July 1985, Brennan reprised her role of Agnes in the 1998 film version of Dancing at Lughnasa, starring alongside Meryl Streep. Her television credits include Cracker: Brotherly Love (1995), South Riding (2011) and The Escape Artist (2013).

Career

Early work
Beginning her acting career in Dublin, Brennan appeared in many of the major theatres including the Gate Theatre, the Abbey Theatre and the Gaiety Theatre, as well as touring community centres with Moving Theatre.

Theatre work
Brennan created the role of Agnes Mundy in Brian Friel's play Dancing at Lughnasa (1990). She played the role in the original Dublin, West End and Broadway (1992–1992) productions, winning the 1992 Tony Award for Best Featured Actress in a Play.

Brennan portrayed the character Janet in the National Theatre's 1994 production of Rutherford and Son and was subsequently nominated for an Olivier Award the following year. She then went on to play the lead role of Lady Macbeth in the Royal Shakespeare Company's national tour of Macbeth in 1996–1997.

In 1999, Brennan played Maisie Madigan in Pearson's production of Juno and the Paycock at the Gaiety Theatre, Dublin, alongside Michael Gambon whom she had previously appeared with in the 1998 film adaptation of Dancing at Lughnasa. In 2002, Brennan was again nominated for an Olivier award for her performance in the Donmar Warehouse's 2001 production of The Little Foxes. In 2006, she starred as Sister Aloysius in a production of Doubt at the Abbey Theatre in Dublin.

In March 2014 it was announced that she had been cast in the role of Kate Keller in Arthur Miller's All My Sons, playing at the Open Air Theatre, Regent's Park in May/June 2014, performing alongside Tom Mannion and Charles Aitken, the latter of whom she had previously performed with in The Old Vic's 2013 production of Sweet Bird of Youth.

In April 2017, she appeared in The Ferryman at the Royal Court Theatre, ahead of a transfer to the Gielgud Theatre in the West End.

Radio, television and film work
Brennan acted in the much acclaimed Billy trilogy of plays for the BBC Play for Today series (1982-84) with fellow Belfast natives Sir Kenneth Branagh and James Ellis. In 1984, Brennan played Collette, one of the main characters in Mike Leigh's television film, Four Days in July, based on the Troubles in Northern Ireland.

On Saturday 31 October 1992, she starred in the infamous BBC One's Screen One Halloween drama Ghostwatch alongside Michael Parkinson, Sarah Greene, Mike Smith and Craig Charles. This ghost story, written by Stephen Volk, was produced in the style of a live television broadcast from an alleged haunted house in North London. Brennan appeared as the mother of the house Pamela Early, who along with her two young daughters was experiencing paranormal events in their house. The drama caused uproar in the UK, with many feeling it was a hoax, designed to let the viewers think it was a real, live show and not a drama. However it did make Brennan become well known, as 11 million viewers tuned into "Ghostwatch" on that Halloween night of 1992.

Brennan featured as a guest star in the British television series Cracker in 1995 as a prostitute-hating killer in the episode "Brotherly Love". Coincidentally, she co-starred in this particular episode with fellow Irish actor Lorcan Cranitch, with whom she would later co-star in Dancing at Lughnasa. 

She reprised her performance of Agnes on screen in Noel Pearson's film adaptation of Dancing at Lughnasa (1998), starring Meryl Streep, for which Brennan won an Irish Film & Television Award for Best Actress.

In 2010, Brennan appeared in the television shows Doctor Who and The Escape Artist, both alongside David Tennant.

Brennan gave an award-winning performance in 2012's Shadow Dancer, winning an IFTA for her role as Ma. According to the director James Marsh, the fact that she had grown up in West Belfast during the Troubles was significant as by casting Irish actors "it felt that they knew this world better than I did and I felt they could help me and guide me".

For RTÉ Radio 1, Brennan played the role of Lucia Joyce in Thomas Kilroy's In the Garden of the Asylum in 2009.

In 2021 she appeared in the Irish-language crime thriller Doineann, along with Peter Coonan.

Awards
 1992 Tony Award for Best Featured Actress in a Play for Dancing at Lughnasa
 1992 Drama Desk Award for Ensemble Performance for Dancing at Lughnasa
 1992 Theatre World Special Award for Ensemble Performance for Dancing at Lughnasa
 1995 Nominated for Olivier Award for Best Actress in a Supporting Role for Rutherford and Son
 1999 Irish Film & Television Award for Best Actress for Dancing at Lughnasa
2002 Nominated for Olivier Award for Best Actress in a Supporting Role for The Little Foxes
 2012 Edinburgh International Film Festival for Best Performance in a British Feature Film for Shadow Dancer (shared with Andrea Riseborough)
 2013 Irish Film & Television Award for Best Supporting Actress Film for Shadow Dancer
2018 Nominated for Olivier Award for Best Actress in a Supporting Role for The Ferryman

Theatre work

Filmography and television work

References

External links
 
 
 
 
 
 

1953 births
Living people
Date of birth missing (living people)
20th-century actresses from Northern Ireland
21st-century actresses from Northern Ireland
Expatriates from Northern Ireland in the United States
Film actresses from Northern Ireland
Radio actresses from Northern Ireland
Stage actresses from Northern Ireland
Television actresses from Northern Ireland
Actresses from Belfast
Tony Award winners